In the Hebrew Bible, Zephon ( Ṣāp̄ōn, Tsāfōn; also Zepho) was a son of Eliphaz (Esau's eldest son). According to the book of Genesis, his brothers were Omar, Teman, Gatam, Kenaz and Amalek. He is mentioned in Genesis 36:11.

According to the legend quoted in Jossipon, he was captured by the military forces of Joseph and imprisoned, later serving as a general for Kittim. According to this account, he became a Latin King in Latium which was the area where Rome was to be founded later along the Tiber river. King Zepho son of Eliphaz was called Janus Saturnus by his subjects.

In the Kabbalistic "Treatise on the Left Emanation" by Isaac ha-Cohen of Soria, Zephon (called Tzephon) is one of the angels associated with the 6th sephira, Tiphereth.

In John Milton's Paradise Lost, Zephon, also Zepho was an angel, sent by the archangel Gabriel together with Ithuriel, to find out the location of Satan after his Fall. 

In Canaanite Religion Zephon was also identified with Jebel Aqra, the home of the Elohim, from which Yam was cast out.

According to John Milton, Zephon is a cherub and a guardian prince of Paradise.

See also
 List of angels in theology

Book of Genesis
Individual angels